Manmohan Waris (born 3 August 1967) is an Indian Punjabi folk/pop singer. He is the elder brother of record producer Sangtar and singer Kamal Heer. Waris is considered one of the most gifted singers of Punjabi folk music.

Career
Manmohan Waris was born in Halluwal, Punjab, India, the eldest son of Dilbag Singh. He started training in music aged 11, passing on what he learnt to his younger brothers. He moved to Canada in 1990, with Waris releasing his first album Gairan Naal Peenghan Jhootdeye in 1993.

He signed with Tips Music and released the album Husn Da Jadu with them in 2000, before starting his own record label, Plasma Records with his brothers, Kamal Heer and Sangtar. He has released the majority of his music on this label.

In 2004 Waris released Nachiye Majajne, the same year touring in the Punjabi Virsa 2004 tour. Following his studio album Dil Nachda in 2007, Waris's latest album, Dil Te Na Laeen was released in 2010. He then toured around the world with Punjabi Virsa 2010.

Waris is married to Pritpal Kaur Heer and they have two children.

Discography

Compilations

Religious albums

Videography

Guest appearances

Unofficial
 Mahiya (Unofficial studio album, released in 1992)
 Kalli Beh Ke Sochi Ni (Remix) (Single)

Live performances

Concerts and tours
In August 2003 he appeared at Shaunki Mela 2003, a Special Tribute Concert for Dhadi Amar Singh Shaunki, with his two brothers.

The three brothers tour every year
 Punjabi Virsa 2004
 Punjabi Virsa 2005
 Punjabi Virsa 2006
 Punjabi Virsa 2007
 Punjabi Virsa 2008
 Punjabi Virsa 2009
 Punjabi Virsa 2010
 Punjabi Virsa 2011
 Punjabi Virsa 2012
 Punjabi Virsa 2014
 Punjabi Virsa 2014
 Punjabi Virsa 2015
 Punjabi Virsa 2016
 Punjabi Virsa 2017

He also performed "parbat Ali Vijay Diwas at a Special Concert for the Indian Armed Forces with Kamal Heer in 2008, and sang at the 2009 Punjabi Music Awards.

Awards 
He was awarded Best Playback Singer at the PTC Punjabi film awards in 2016 for his rendition of "Parne Nu" from the film Faraar.

References

External links
 
 Manmohan Waris & Kamal Heer on Facebook

1970 births
Bhangra (music) musicians
Indian male pop singers
Indian Sikhs
Living people
Punjabi people
Punjabi-language singers
Punjabi Virsa
Waris Brothers